Eugene Holmes Curtis (May 5, 1883 – January 1, 1919) was a professional baseball player. He played in five games in Major League Baseball for the 1903 Pittsburgh Pirates as an outfielder. Nicknamed "Eude",  he attended West Virginia University, where he played college baseball for the Mountaineers.

References

External links

Major League Baseball outfielders
Pittsburgh Pirates players
Wheeling Stogies players
Colorado Springs Millionaires players
Des Moines Undertakers players
Springfield Babes (baseball) players
Terre Haute Hottentots players
Pueblo Indians players
Grand Rapids Wolverines players
Atlanta Crackers players
Dayton Veterans players
South Bend Greens players
Roanoke Tigers players
East Liverpool Potters (baseball) players
Erie Sailors players
West Virginia Mountaineers baseball players
Baseball players from West Virginia
Minor league baseball managers
People from Bethany, West Virginia
1883 births
1919 deaths